is a Japanese series created by Kyoko Mizuki. The main character, Candice "Candy" White Ardley, is a blonde girl with freckles, large emerald green eyes and long hair, worn in pigtails with bows. Candy Candy first appeared as a manga in April 1975, written by Japanese writer Keiko Nagita under the pen name Kyoko Mizuki and illustrated by manga artist Yumiko Igarashi, a collaboration which was put together by the Japanese magazine Nakayoshi who were interested in recreating a "masterpiece" manga in the same vein as Heidi, Anne of Green Gables and other famous classic titles of literature read predominantly by young girls. The manga series ran for four years and won the 1st Kodansha Manga Award for shōjo in 1977. The story was adapted into an anime series by Toei Animation. There are also three animated short films.

Plot
The Candy Candy manga provides a story for the shōjo demographic. Candy, an abandoned orphan taken in by the orphanage Pony's Home near Lake Michigan around the start of the 20th century, spent the first years of her life at the orphanage, to where she would often return to repose and to decide her next course in life. When Annie, her best friend at the orphanage, was adopted, she ran outside crying and met briefly a boy who told her not to cry. Candy retained fond memories of the boy and, not knowing his name, remembered him as the "Prince on the Hill". The boy will have great influence and importance in her life later on.

When she turned 12, Candy was taken in by the Leagan family as a companion for their daughter Eliza and her brother Neil. The Leagans treated her poorly and eventually made Candy a servant girl. When the Leagan family accused Candy of stealing and sent her off to work in their family farm in Mexico, Candy was rescued from being sent to Mexico by William Ardlay, the sole heir of the very wealthy Ardlay family and the owner of the Ardlay estate. William Ardlay became Candy's tutor until she would reach adulthood, but his true identity remained a mystery and she would not meet him until the end of the story. He was also the uncle of Candy's first love, Anthony Brown, and a relative of Anthony's cousins, the Cornwell brothers Archibald (Archie) and Alistair (Stear), as well as the Leagan children.

Later on, Anthony died in a hunting accident when he was thrown off the horseback. Thereafter, Candy, along with Archie and Stear, and the Leagan children, were sent to London to attend the prestigious St. Paul's College, a secondary school, where she met Terrence (Terrius/Terry) Granchester, the illegitimate child of a British Duke with American Broadway actress Eleanor Baker. Candy once saw him crying on the same boat she was taking to London from America. Terry was allegedly her "second and grand love that cannot bear fruit" (in the words of the author Keiko Nagita/Kyoko Mizuki in essays believed to be found on Misaki's website). Circumstances divided the pair when Eliza Leagan schemed to have Candy expelled from St. Paul's by manipulating them into a scandal.

After the scandal, Terry left St. Paul's to protect Candy's reputation and pursue his aspiration to become an actor, but Candy also decided to leave soon after. They would both embark on their individual life journeys forward in the United States, where Candy trained to become a nurse in Chicago around the time of World War I,  and Terry pursued a career as a rising star actor in New York. An actress and colleague in his theater troupe, Susanna, became attracted to Terry. During a rehearsal session, an accident occurred and Susanna saved Terry's life, but in the process became disabled. Her injury destroyed her acting career. Susanna became depressed and attempted to commit suicide as she did not want to be a burden to anyone and her career was ruined. Feeling responsible, Terry was torn between reuniting with Candy and his concern for Susanna. When Candy discovered what happened without Terry ever telling her beforehand, she decided to sacrifice her own happiness and left Terry. Candy knew that Terry would remain with Susanna as this was the decision he had already made on his own accord without ever consulting with Candy.

Afterwards, Candy returned to Chicago to continue her life. By chance, she became the nurse and caretaker to Albert, who lost his memories after a World War I related bomb explosion on a train in Italy. Candy and Albert decided to live together and their cohabitation lasted for several years during Albert's amnesiac state. Yet, Albert ultimately regained his memories and revealed his true identity to Candy. At the end of the story, Candy discovered that he was also the Prince on the Hill. Their relationship had moved on to a different level during their adulthood.
In Italy, however, the anime's ending was changed albeit without the endorsement of Keiko Nagita and TOEI productions. Based on this unofficial Italian version, Candy and Terry meet again at a train station deciding to stay together. This ending, however, is simply based on fanfiction and not on any official publication by the author or her agent, therefore, never achieving any international acclaim or official recognition.

In 2010 the novel "Candy Candy The Final Story" was re-edited by Mizuki using her real name Keiko Nagita. In this revised novel based on an earlier 1970s text, Candy discovers that Suzanne died when reading about it in the newspaper. At an undefined time, Candy receives a note signed with the initials "T.G.". Albeit never confirmed in the text itself, these initials are allegedly ascribed to the stage actor, Terry Graham. He no longer uses his father's surname "Granchester" as he had renounced it upon his departure from the UK several years ago. The note itself is obscure and thus open to a multitude of interpretations. The novel ends with Candy in her mid-30s living with the man she loves during the Interbellum. The identity of this man is never revealed in the text and there is no evidence indicating who this character is. In addition, there is no indication whether Candy is married or not, employed or has children of her own. All the reader knows is that she is happy to be with the man she loves-whoever he may be.

There were some plot and character differences between the manga and the anime: Candy's age was different for several events when she grew up at Pony's Home. In the manga, she was six or seven years old when she met her Prince of the Hill, but was ten in the anime. Her sidekick pet raccoon Kurin/Clint belonged solely to the anime version.

Novel
Kyoko Mizuki's (the pen name of Keiko Nagita) Candy Candy novel, consisting of three volumes, has piqued the interest of Candy Candy fans outside Japan for some years. This novel was only available in Japan and published in Japanese.

Of particular interest is the 3rd volume, which covers the period after the events chronicled in the manga and anime. The novels have been translated in their entirety by Western fans but the translations confirmed that, true to her artistic form, Kyoko Mizuki did not provide concrete closure to the story.  Yet, in the last letter that closed out the novel, Candy was still an optimistic, life-loving and cheerful heroine.

In 2010, Kyoko Mizuki, under her real name Keiko Nagita, revised and published the "Candy Candy Final Story" (CCFS). CCFS was published in two volumes and not three volumes as the earlier novels. She announced that this was her effort to tell the story as she always intended from the beginning, without the influence of the manga illustrator or the manga production team. Yet, most of the plot of the story remained the same and it is also entirely identical to her earlier novel which had been published several times since the 1970s. Furthermore, Keiko Nagita specifies that she wants her readers to imagine the characters' appearances based on the manga illustrations of Yumiko Igarashi as there are almost no such descriptions found in her own novel. Minor changes were made mainly to details of descriptions to scenes. She did, however, add a few new developments to CCFS. In CCFS, Susanna had died from a chronic illness years after Candy and Terry had separated. It is not said in the CCFS whether Candy responded to a note she had received which had been signed with the initials "T.G.". It is alleged that this note may belong to Terry Graham but that is never confirmed in the text nor is it specified whether Candy responded to that letter or not. Then the novel proceeds with the final section known as the "Epilogue" where a series of letters are exchanged between Candy and Albert. Candy includes a recollection of her (unsent) letter to Anthony where she reflects upon her life thus far. Keiko Nagita also added a final scene where Candy, in her thirties and living in an unknown place near a river called Avon, greets her beloved as he enters their home. The man's name is never revealed, but Nagita said that she was satisfied knowing that Candy now lived a happy life with that mystery man.

In 2015, the Italian publisher Kappalab obtained the copyright to publish CCFS in its entirety in Italian. The first volume was published in early 2015. The second volume was released in summer 2015.

Manga
Announcement of the Candy Candy manga appeared in the March 1975 issue of Nakayoshi. The first chapter was published in April 1975, and continued until the last chapter in March 1979. However, the story did not appear in the November 1975, December 1976, January 1978 and June 1978 issues. The manga was published in 9 volumes.

Volumes
1 (2 October 1975)
2 (8 March 1976)
3 (8 August 1976)
4 (8 December 1976)
5 (18 March 1977)
6 (18 September 1977)
7 (18 April 1978)
8 (18 November 1978)
9 (19 March 1979)

Anime

After the manga had become popular among Japanese girls, an anime series was produced for NET (now known as TV Asahi) in 1976. The anime has 115 episodes which run for 25 minutes each. and It had a wide popularity in Europe and Latin America.

There are four animated short films: Candy Candy (1977), Candy Candy: The Call of Spring/The May Festival (1978), Candy Candy's Summer Vacation (1978) and Candy Candy the Movie (1992).

Cast
Minori Matsushima as Candice "Candy" White Ardlay
Makio Inoue as William Albert Ardlay
Kei Tomiyama as Terrence "Terrius/Terry" Graham Granchester
Kazuhiko Inoue as Anthony Brown
Ryo Horikawa as Anthony Brown (1992 film)
Kaneta Kimotsuki as Alistair "Stear" Cornwell
Yūji Mitsuya as Archibald "Archie" Cornwell
Mami Koyama as Annie Brighton
Yumi Touma as Annie Brighton (1992 film)
Chiyoko Kawashima as Patricia "Patty" O'Brien
Yumi Nakatani as Eliza Leagan
Eiko Hisamura as Eliza Leagan (1992 film)
Kiyoshi Komiyama as Neil Leagan
Ryuusei Nakao as Neil Leagan (1992 film)
Taeko Nakanishi as Sister Pony, Grandaunt Elory and Narrator
Nana Yamaguchi as Sister Lane, Mrs. Leagan and Sister Gray
Miyoko Aso as Mary Jane Headmistress
Sachiko Chijimatsu as Jimmy
Eken Mine as Garcia
Koko Kagawa as Susanna Marlowe

Live action

Film
In 1981 the Drama/Family live action movie of the manga & anime has been produced by Chu-ji Choi, directed by In-hyeon Choi, and written by Man Izawa. Shin-hie Choi is starring, alongside Do-hie Kim, Hyo-jeong Eom, Bo-geun Song and Eun-suk Yu. Due to licensing issue, the movie only made it on domestic release.

TV series
Sinemart as one of largest Indonesia production house made modern storytelling of Candy Candy with titled Candy drama series produced by Leo Sutanto & directed by Widi Wijaya aired on channel RCTI in 2007 starring Rachel Amanda, Nimaz Dewantary, Lucky Perdana & Bobby Joseph.

Releases
Between 1998 and 2001, three lawsuits were settled between Kyoko Mizuki, Yumiko Igarashi and Toei Animation over the ownership of the Candy Candy copyrights. These lawsuits made Toei halt the broadcast of the Candy Candy anime, which Mizuki has expressed disappointment over. In the 2000s, Candy Candy episodes began to be sold on bootleg DVD format, as the legal lawsuits between the authors halted any production of licensed goods. In 2005 and 2006, illegal/unlicensed Candy box sets began to appear. The first being from France, included the French and Japanese dialogue. Two Korean box sets are now out of stock, they include the Japanese and Korean dialogue, and Korean subtitles. 20 discs altogether are divided into two box sets and available from HanBooks and Sensasian. Prior to the release, illegal/unlicensed Spanish DVD sets with poor audio and video were widely available on eBay. The illegal/unlicensed DVD set is issued in both Mandarin and Japanese with Chinese, English and Korean subtitles. On January 8, 2007, Chilean newspaper Las Últimas Noticias began issuing illegal/unlicensed DVDs of  Candy Candy with its issues every Monday, with plans to continue to do so until all 115 episodes were released. In 2008, an illegal/unlicensed 115-episode DVD set was released in Taiwan.

In 1980, ZIV International acquired the U.S. rights to the series. The first two episodes were dubbed into English, with a new theme song and score created by in-house composer Mark Mercury. This was ultimately condensed into a straight-to-video production, released on tape in 1981 by Media Home Entertainment and then by Family Home Entertainment. It is unknown if any more episodes were dubbed for the American market. None of these have been subsequently reissued.

Legacy
In 2011, the series was parodied on an SNL J-Pop! America Fun Time Now! sketch.

References

External links

1975 manga
1979 comics endings
1975 novels
1976 anime television series debuts
1978 anime films
1979 Japanese television series endings
1970s animated short films
1990s animated short films
1992 anime films
Anime short films
Films based on Japanese novels
Animated films based on manga
Kodansha manga
Manga adapted into films
Shōjo manga
Television shows based on Japanese novels
Toei Animation television
TV Asahi original programming
Winner of Kodansha Manga Award (Shōjo)
Television shows set in England
Television shows set in London
Romance anime and manga
Drama anime and manga
Historical anime and manga
Comics set in London
Comics set in England